Ponnum Poovum is a 1982 Indian Malayalam-language film, directed by A. Vincent and produced by S. Pavamani. The film stars Mammootty, Nedumudi Venu, Menaka and Prathapachandran. The film's score was composed by K. Raghavan.

Cast

Mammootty as Salim
Nedumudi Venu as Dasan
Menaka as Subhadra
Sukumaran as Balan Nair
Prathapachandran as Pillai
 Sukumari as Lakshmi
 Bahadoor as Khader
Sabitha Anand as Woman in Taxi
T. R. Omana as Radha
Master Suresh as Unnimon

Soundtrack
The music was composed by K. Raghavan with lyrics by P. Bhaskaran.

References

External links
 

1982 films
1980s Malayalam-language films
Films directed by A. Vincent